Maharajpur is a town in Kanpur district in the state of Uttar Pradesh, India located at an elevation of 121 m above MSL. Maharajpur is well connected by rail and road.

Cities and towns in Kanpur Nagar district